This is a list of the first women lawyer(s) and judge(s) in Massachusetts. It includes the year in which the women were admitted to practice law (in parentheses). Also included are women who achieved other distinctions such becoming the first in their state to graduate from law school or become a political figure.

Firsts in state history

Law School 

 First African American female law graduate: Blanche E. Braxton in 1923

Lawyers 

 First female: Lelia J. Robinson (1882) 
First female (to argue case in jury trial): Anna Christy Fall (1891) 
First female (to appear before the full bench of the Massachusetts Supreme Judicial Court): Margaret M. McChesney (1921) in 1926 
 First African American female: Blanche E. Braxton (1923): lawyer in Massachusetts. She is also the first African American female lawyer to practice in the United States District Court in Massachusetts in 1933.
 First Armenian American female: Norma M. Karaian  
 First African American female (to follow her father to the bar and practice law with him): Jacqueline R. Guild Lloyd (1933) 
 First African American female (practice before the United States District Court of Massachusetts): Blanche E. Braxton (1923) in 1933 
First openly LGBT (female): Katherine Triantafillou (1975)

State judges 

 First females: Emma Fall Schofield (1908) and Sadie Lipner Shulman (1911) in 1930  
 First female (full judgeship and a presiding judge): Ethel E. Mackiernan (c. 1918) during the 1930s  
 First female (Associate Justice of the Boston Municipal Court): Jennie Loitman Barron (c. 1914) in 1937 
 First female (Associate Judge of the Massachusetts Superior Court): Jennie Loitman Barron (c. 1914) around 1959
 First female (probate court): Sheila E. McGovern in 1974
 First African American female: Margaret Burnham in 1977  
 First female (Massachusetts Appeals Court): Charlotte Anne Perretta in 1978  
 First female to serve on the Massachusetts Supreme Judicial Court: Ruth Abrams in 1978 
 First female [First Justice of the Massachusetts Probate and Family Court (Middlesex)]: Sheila E. McGovern in 1980
First Latino American female: María López (1978) in 1988 
First openly LGBT female: Linda Giles in 1991  
First person of color (Massachusetts Probate and Family Court): Judith Nelson Dilday (1974) in 1993 
First female (Massachusetts Supreme Judicial Court): Margaret H. Marshall in 1999  
First Indian American female: Sabita Singh (1990) 
First openly LGBT female (Massachusetts Supreme Judicial Court): Barbara Lenk (1979) in 2011 
 First Asian American (female) (Massachusetts Supreme Judicial Court): Fernande R. V. Duffly in 2011 
First African American female (Massachusetts Appeals Court): Geraldine Hines in 2013  
 First Korean American female: Eleanor Coe Sinnott in 2014  
 First Latino American female (Massachusetts Supreme Judicial Court): Dalila Argaez Wendlandt in 2020

Federal judges 
First female (United States Bankruptcy Court in the District of Massachusetts and its First Circuit): Carol. J. Kenner in 1986
First Asian Pacific American female (U.S. District Court for the District of Massachusetts): Indira Talwani (1988) in 2014  
First African American female (U.S. District Court for the District of Massachusetts): Denise J. Casper (1994)

Attorney General of Massachusetts 

First female: Martha Coakley (c. 1979) from 2007-2015 
First openly LGBT female: Maura Healey (1998) in 2015  
First African American female: Andrea Campbell in 2022

Assistant Attorney General of Massachusetts 

 First female: Emma Fall Schofield (1908) 
First African American female: Glendora Putnam (1948) in 1964

U.S. Attorney for Massachusetts 

 First (Hispanic American) female: Carmen Ortiz (1981) in 2009 
 First African American female: Rachael Rollins in 2022

District Attorney 

First female: Elizabeth “Betsy” Scheibel in 1993 
First African American female: Rachael Rollins in 2018

Political Office 

 First openly lesbian female (Governor-elect of Massachusetts): Maura Healey (1998) in 2022

Massachusetts Bar Association 

 First female (president): Alice E. Richmond from 1986-1987

Firsts in local history 

 Elizabeth “Betsy” Scheibel: First female to serve as the District Attorney for the Northwestern District in Massachusetts (1993) [Franklin and Hampshire Counties, Massachusetts]
 Harriet L. Kilbourne (1897): First female admitted to the Berkshire County Bar Association [Berkshire County, Massachusetts]
Andrea Harrington: First female District Attorney for Berkshire County, Massachusetts (2018)
Mary E. Hyde: First female lawyer in Fall River, Massachusetts [Bristol County, Massachusetts]
Elvah H. Young (1899): First female lawyer in Hampden County, Massachusetts

Martha Coakley (c. 1979): First female District Attorney for Middlesex County, Massachusetts
Ruth Abrams: First female to serve as the Assistant District Attorney for Middlesex County, Massachusetts
Margaret Montoya: First Latino American female to graduate from Harvard Law School (1972) [Cambridge, Middlesex County, Massachusetts]
Linda Sheryl Greene: First African American female to teach at Harvard Law School (1981) 
Haben Girma (2013): First deafblind graduate (who is also female and of Eritrean-Ethiopian descent) of Harvard Law School [Cambridge, Middlesex County, Massachusetts]
Priscila Coronado: First Latino American female to serve as the President of the Harvard Law Review (2021)
Arlene Hassett: First female judge in Lowell, Massachusetts (1972) [Middlesex County, Massachusetts]

 Anna E. Hirsch: First female (a lawyer) elected as the Registrar of Probate in Norfolk County, Massachusetts (1954)

 Katherine Triantafillou (1975): First openly LGBT (female) lawyer in Massachusetts 
Gene D. Dahmen: First female President of the Boston Bar Association (1987-1988) [Suffolk County, Massachusetts]
Camille A. Nelson: First (African American) female to serve as the Dean of Suffolk University Law School (2010)
Rachael Rollins: First female (and African American female) to become a District Attorney for Suffolk County, Massachusetts (2018)
Michelle Wu: First (Asian American) female (a lawyer) to serve as the Mayor of Boston, Massachusetts (2021)

Stephanie Grant (1908): First female admitted to the Worcester Bar Association
Addie Gillette (1897): First female lawyer to actually practice in Worcester County, Massachusetts

See also  

 List of first women lawyers and judges in the United States
 Timeline of women lawyers in the United States
 Women in law

Other topics of interest 

 List of first minority male lawyers and judges in the United States
 List of first minority male lawyers and judges in Massachusetts

References 

Lawyers, Massachusetts, first
Massachusetts, first
Women, Massachusetts, first
Women, Massachusetts, first
Women in Massachusetts
Lists of people from Massachusetts
Massachusetts lawyers